Egyptian religion may refer to:

 Modern Religion in Egypt
 Ancient Egyptian religion